Fighter's Challenge is an adventure for the 2nd edition of the Advanced Dungeons & Dragons fantasy role-playing game, published in 1992.

Contents
The module is designed for one to three players, generally of a single warrior class of levels 2–4, although multiple-class player characters are allowed.

Publication history
Fighter's Challenge was published by TSR and written by John Terra.

Reception
Keith H. Eisenbeis reviewed the module in the March–April 1993 issue of White Wolf Magazine. He noted problems such as difficult encounters and an overabundance of treasure and magic items in the module, but concluded that it "is a well-written adventure that keeps the mystery, surprises and action at a high level and should be an enjoyable experience for both player and [Dungeon Master]". Eisenbeis rated it an overall 3 out of a possible 5.

References

Dungeons & Dragons modules
Role-playing game supplements introduced in 1992